Cristóvão de Figueiredo (died ) was a Portuguese Renaissance painter.

Like many other important painters of the time, Cristóvão de Figueiredo was a pupil of Master Jorge Afonso, in Lisbon, in the early 16th century. He later worked together with Francisco Henriques, Garcia Fernandes and Gregório Lopes in executing various altarpieces in Lisbon.

Between 1522 and 1533, Cristóvão de Figueiredo worked in the Santa Cruz Monastery in Coimbra and, in 1533, again joined Garcia Fernandes and Gregório Lopes in painting altarpieces for the Monastery of Ferreirim, near Lamego.

Many of his paintings are now in the National Museum of Ancient Art (Lisbon) and the Machado de Castro Museum (Coimbra).

Works

References 
 Portuguese painting in the Age of Humanism (by Joaquim Oliveira Caetano).
 Portuguese Renaissance painting (by Maria José Palla).

External links

 Paintings by Cristovão de Figueiredo (Six Centuries of Portuguese Painting website).

Portuguese painters
Portuguese male painters
Year of death unknown
1540s deaths
16th-century Portuguese people
Portuguese Renaissance painters
Year of birth unknown